In Greek mythology, Hegetoria was a local nymph at Rhodes who married Ochimus. They had a daughter, Cydippe or Cyrbia, who married Ochimus's brother, Cercaphus, successor to his brother's power. According to an alternate version, Ochimus engaged Cydippe to Ocridion but Cercaphus loved her and kidnapped her. He did not return until Ochimus was old.

Notes

Nymphs

References 

 Diodorus Siculus, The Library of History translated by Charles Henry Oldfather. Twelve volumes. Loeb Classical Library. Cambridge, Massachusetts: Harvard University Press; London: William Heinemann, Ltd. 1989. Vol. 3. Books 4.59–8. Online version at Bill Thayer's Web Site
 Diodorus Siculus, Bibliotheca Historica. Vol 1-2. Immanel Bekker. Ludwig Dindorf. Friedrich Vogel. in aedibus B. G. Teubneri. Leipzig. 1888-1890. Greek text available at the Perseus Digital Library.
 Lucius Mestrius Plutarchus, Moralia with an English Translation by Frank Cole Babbitt. Cambridge, MA. Harvard University Press. London. William Heinemann Ltd. 1936. Online version at the Perseus Digital Library. Greek text available from the same website.